Nazacara (Hispanicized spelling) or Nasa Q'ara (Aymara nasa nose, q'ara bare, bald) is a village in the La Paz Department in Bolivia. It is the seat of the Nazacara Canton in the San Andrés de Machaca Municipality which is the fifth municipal section of the Ingavi Province.

References 

 www.ine.gov.bo

Populated places in La Paz Department (Bolivia)